Saint-Sulpice-de-Royan is a commune in the French department of Charente-Maritime, region of Nouvelle-Aquitaine (formerly Poitou-Charentes), southwestern France.

Population

See also
Communes of the Charente-Maritime department

References

Communes of Charente-Maritime